The swimming competition at the 2022 ASEAN University Games will be held in Ubon Rachathani, Thailand in Ban Yang Noi Campus.

2022 ASEAN University Games officially the 20th ASEAN University Games and also known as Ubon Ratchathani 2022 is a regional multi-sport event currently held from 26 July to 6 August 2022 in Ubon Ratchathani, Thailand. Originally planned to take place from 13 to 22 December 2020, it was eventually rescheduled as a result of the COVID-19 pandemic.

Medal table

Medalists

Men

Women

External links 
Official website

References

2022 ASEAN University Games
2022 ASEAN University Games